Banca Lombarda e Piemontese was an Italian banking group. It was formed as Banca Lombarda in 1998 by the merger of Banca San Paolo di Brescia (with subsidiary Banca di Valle Camonica)  and Credito Agrario Bresciano (with subsidiary Banco di San Giorgio). The group merged with Banca Regionale Europea in 2000, which changed their name to reflect the extension to Piedmont region. In 2007 the group merged with Banche Popolari Unite to form UBI Banca.

The group was a minority shareholders of Banca Intesa, partly due to the sales of Cariparma's shares to Banca Intesa and partially due to the warrants issued to Banca San Paolo di Brescia.

Former subsidiaries
 Banco di Brescia
 Banca di Valle Camonica
 Banco di San Giorgio
 Banca Regionale Europea acquired in 2000
 Cassa di Risparmio di Tortona acquired in 1999
 Banca Lombarda Private Investment
 Banca della Valle d'Aosta minority interests

External links

 La Storia 
 Entry in Borsa Italiana 

Banks established in 1998
Italian companies established in 1988
Banks disestablished in 2007
Italian companies disestablished in 2007
Defunct banks of Italy
Companies based in Brescia
 
Companies formerly listed on the Borsa Italiana